La contadina in corte is an opera buffa in two acts by Antonio Sacchini, first performed at the Teatro Valle in Rome during the Carnival in 1765. The libretto was by Niccolò Tassi. It was a popular opera at the time of its first performance: by the 1780s it had been staged over 20 times in such diverse cities as Rome and Warsaw. Sacchini's original setting is an intermezzo with four roles. 

There was a revival at the Teatro Verdi in Sassari in Sardinia in 1991, conducted by Gabriele Catalucci and directed by Gianni Marras.

Roles

Recordings
Sacchini: La contadina in corte  - Sassari Symphony Orchestra
 Conductor: Gabriele Catalucci
 Principal singers: Cinzia Forte, Susanna Rigacci, Ernesto Palacio, Giorgio Gatti
 Recording date:? (published 1994)
 Label: Bongiovanni -  (CD)

References

 Mary Hunter: "La contadina in Corte", Grove Music Online ed L. Macy (Accessed 28 May 2007), grovemusic.com, subscription access.
 John A. Rice, "The Roman Intermezzo and Sacchini's La contadina in corte

Italian-language operas
Operas by Antonio Sacchini
Opera buffa
Operas
1765 operas